Psilogramma edii is a moth of the  family Sphingidae. It is known from eastern Sumatra in Indonesia.

References

Psilogramma
Moths described in 2001
Endemic fauna of Indonesia